A vs B were a British male production duo formed by Daniel Thornton and Geoff Taylor, who released the speed garage single "Ripped in 2 Minutes". It was released on the Positiva label, and entered the UK Singles Chart on 9 May 1998 at number 49; it remained on the chart for two weeks. The song samples Jomanda's "Make My Body Rock", Bug Kann & the Plastic Jam's "Made in Two Minutes" and Renegade's "Terrorist". Mixmag included the song in their list of "The 15 Best Speed Garage Records Released in '97 and '98".

References

English dance music groups
English electronic music duos
Speed garage musicians
UK garage groups
Positiva Records artists